Hostetter is a census-designated place located in Unity Township, Westmoreland County in the state of Pennsylvania, United States.  It is located near Pennsylvania Route 981.  As of the 2010 census the population was 740 residents.

Demographics

References

Census-designated places in Westmoreland County, Pennsylvania
Census-designated places in Pennsylvania